Robin Hill may refer to:

People 

 Robin Hill (biochemist) (18991991), British plant biochemist
 Robin Hill, 8th Marquess of Downshire (19292003), Irish peer
 Robin Hill (Australian artist) (born 1932), Australian artist
 Robin Hill (American artist) (born 1955), American visual artist

Places 
 Robin Hill, New South Wales, Australia
 Robin Hill Country Park, Downend, Isle of Wight, UK
 Robin Hill Cemetery, Marlborough, Massachusetts, USA

Hill, Robin